Kentish Council is a local government body in Tasmania, situated in the north-west of the state, to the south and inland from Devonport. Kentish is classified as a rural local government area and has a population of 6,324, the major towns of the municipality are Sheffield, Railton and Wilmot.

History and attributes
The area was explored by the surveyor Nathaniel Kentish in 1842 who was given the task of finding a route from Deloraine through to Tasmania's north west coast. Kentish's last name has remained as the name of the area. The municipality was established on 1 January 1907. Kentish is classified as rural, agricultural and large (RAL) under the Australian Classification of Local Governments.

The area is a high-tourism region. Attractions include Cradle Mountain, Lake Barrington and the mural town of Sheffield.

Suburbs

Missing from above list
 Cradle Mountain
 Kimberley
 Latrobe
 Liena
 Melrose
 Merseylea
 Mersey Forest
 Paloona
 South Nietta
 South Spreyton
 Weegena
 West Coast

See also
List of local government areas of Tasmania

References

External links
Kentish Council official website
Local Government Association Tasmania
Tasmanian Electoral Commission - local government

Kentish Council
Local government areas of Tasmania